The 1965 Arab League Summit was a secret summit held from September 13 to 17 in Casablanca, Morocco. It was the third meeting of the Council of Heads of Member States of the Arab League. The summit was boycotted by Tunisia over disagreements with Egypt.

Participants
The Council of Heads of Member States of the Arab League included:

: King Hussein  
:  President Houari Boumédiène 
: President  Ismail al-Azhari 
: President Gamal Abdel Nasser 
:  President  Abdul Rahman Arif
: King Faisal bin Abdulaziz Al Saud  
: President Amin al-Hafiz 
: (North Yemen) President  Abdullah al-Sallal  
: Emir Abdullah Al-Salim Al-Sabah
: President  Charles Helou  
: Crown Prince Hasan as-Senussi
: King Hassan II  
: Chairman Ahmad Shukeiri (PLO)

Issues 
The tensions between Pakistan and India in relation to the Kashmir issue was discussed.

Intelligence leak 
According to Shlomo Gazit of Israeli intelligence main purpose of the secret meeting was to discuss whether the Arab countries were ready for war against Israel, and if so, whether they should create a joint Arab command for such a conflict. King Hassan II of Morocco invited Mossad and Shin Bet agents to bug the Casablanca hotel where the Arab League Summit would be held to record the conversations of the Arab leaders. Thanks to the recordings “[Israelis] reached the conclusion that the Egyptian Armored Corps was in pitiful shape and not prepared for battle.” This information was instrumental in Israel's major victory over Egypt, Jordan and Syria in the Six-Day War. According to Ronen Bergman, Mossad then supplied information leading to Mehdi Ben Barka's capture and assassination in October.

References 

1965 Arab League summit
History of Casablanca
1965 in politics
1965 in Morocco
Diplomatic conferences in Morocco
20th-century diplomatic conferences
1965 in international relations
20th century in Casablanca
September 1965 events in Africa
1965 conferences